John Astley (3 December 1909 – 8 November 1984) was an English professional footballer who played in the Football League for Southport, Brentford and Coventry City as a right back.

Club career

Early years 
A right back, Astley began his career in his native north west, playing for a number of amateur clubs before joining Third Division North club Southport in 1930. He made just two appearances for the club before joining League of Ireland club Shelbourne on loan for the 1932–33 season. He left Southport at the end of the 1932–33 season.

Brentford 
Astley transferred to Second Division club Brentford in May 1933. He went straight into the team and made 41 appearances during the 1933–34 season, in which the Bees finished fourth in the Second Division. The arrival of full backs Arthur Bateman and George Poyser during the 1934 off-season and an injury saw Astley lose his place in the team and he made just one appearance during the 1934–35 season, in which Brentford secured promotion to the First Division as champions. He instead played for the reserves and won the 1935 London Challenge Cup with the team. Astley managed to make eight appearances in the First Division during the first half of the 1935–36 season, before departing Griffin Park in February 1936. Astley made 50 appearances for Brentford.

Coventry City 
Astley joined Third Division South high-flyers Coventry City in February 1936. He made 14 appearances in what remained of the 1935–36 season and helped the Sky Blues to the Third Division South title. Astley displaced Vic Brown from the team and with former Brentford teammate Walter Metcalf on the other flank at full back, he was an ever-present until professional football was suspended in 1939 upon to the outbreak of the Second World War. He made 148 appearances for the Sky Blues and guested for Nottingham Forest during the war.

Representative career 
While with Shelbourne, Astley played for the League of Ireland representative team against their Welsh League counterparts.

Personal life 
Astley served in the British Army during and after the Second World War and rose to the rank of captain. He married his wife, an Estonian, during -years stationed in Germany. Astley settled in Coventry in 1950 and began working for the General Electric Company, retiring in 1974. He died of a heart attack in Whitley Hospital in November 1984.

Honours
Brentford Reserves
 London Challenge Cup: 1934–35
Coventry City
Football League Third Division South: 1935–36

Career statistics

References

1909 births
1984 deaths
Footballers from Warrington
English footballers
Association football fullbacks
Southport F.C. players
Shelbourne F.C. players
Coventry City F.C. players
League of Ireland players
League of Ireland XI players
English Football League players
Brentford F.C. players
Nottingham Forest F.C. wartime guest players
British Army personnel of World War II
British Army officers